Arthrosaura montigena is a species of lizard in the family Gymnophthalmidae. It is endemic to Venezuela.

References

Arthrosaura
Reptiles described in 2008
Reptiles of Venezuela
Endemic fauna of Venezuela
Taxa named by Charles W. Myers
Taxa named by Maureen Ann Donnelly